"Can We Still Be Friends" is a song written and originally performed by Todd Rundgren.

Todd Rundgren version
Todd Rundgren released his version on his 1978 album Hermit of Mink Hollow. This was the only hit single on the album, reaching #29 on the US Billboard Hot 100, and also peaking at #8 in Australia. The lyrics describe a relationship to which Rundgren and the woman to whom he is singing have given great effort to fix the relationship, but simply cannot work. Rundgren explains this, but wishes to part amicably, asking several times if he and his partner can "still be friends." The song is generally assumed to be about Rundgren's breakup with long-time companion Bebe Buell in 1977. Rundgren played all the instruments and performed all the vocals on the track, as he did with the rest of the album.

In 1994, the song made a prominent appearance in the film Dumb and Dumber, for which Rundgren had composed the score. It also appears on the soundtrack for the 2001 film Vanilla Sky, and the TV series Nip/Tuck.

Charts

Weekly charts

Year-end charts

Robert Palmer version

In 1979, "Can We Still Be Friends" became a hit again when Robert Palmer recorded a version for his album Secrets.

Chart performance

Mandy Moore version

In 2003, Mandy Moore recorded her own version of the song from her third studio album Coverage, composed entirely of cover songs.

Other versions
Colin Blunstone recorded a version on his 1979 album "Late Nights in Soho".
Rod Stewart recorded the song as a track for his 1984 album Camouflage. His version is performed at a faster tempo than Rundgren's and Palmer's versions and features more prominent use of the synthesizer.
Marc Jordan recorded the song as a track for his 1990 album COW
In 2001, Vonda Shepard's version appeared on a soundtrack for the television show Ally McBeal; this is very first revived song of Shepard.
Kate Markowitz recorded it for her 2003 album Map of the World.
Argentine rock musicians Charly García and Nito Mestre, founding members of the band Sui Generis, recorded a Spanish version entitled "Yo soy su papá" ("I am his father"), which appeared on their 2000 album Sinfonías para adolescentes (Symphonies for Teenagers).
Filipino singer, actress and TV host Toni Gonzaga covered the song as part of the soundtrack of the 2017 film of the same name starring Gerald Anderson and Arci Muñoz.

References

1970s ballads
Todd Rundgren songs
Robert Palmer (singer) songs
Rod Stewart songs
1978 singles
1979 singles
Songs written by Todd Rundgren
Song recordings produced by Todd Rundgren
1978 songs
Rock ballads
Bearsville Records singles
Island Records singles
Mandy Moore songs
Songs about friendship